Saint-Jean-de-l'Île-d'Orléans is a municipality in the Capitale-Nationale region of Quebec, Canada. It is part of the L'Île-d'Orléans Regional County Municipality, on the southeastern side of Île d'Orléans.

Prior to April 5, 2003, it was known simply as Saint-Jean.

History
The area was first colonized early in the 17th century. In 1680, a mission was founded and served by the priest of Sainte-Famille. In 1714, the Parish of Saint-Jean-Baptiste was formed and became a civil parish in 1722. It is believed that this name commemorates Jean de Lauson, Seneschal in New France and son of Governor Lauson, born circa 1620 and killed at the mouth of the Maheu River in 1661 by the Iroquois. Nevertheless, it could also be attributed to John the Baptist in line with the many other religious toponyms on the island.

Although having a well-established agricultural history, Saint-Jean's location on the Saint Lawrence River prompted also development of maritime and fishing trades. It was especially known for its river pilots who would guide vessels through the treacherous Saint Lawrence navigation channel. Over the centuries, a great number of river pilots came from Saint-Jean.

In 1845 the Municipality of Saint-Jean was formed, but abolished in 1847 when it became part of the County Municipality. In 1852, its post office opened. In 1855, it was reestablished as the Parish Municipality of Saint-Jean-Baptiste. In 2003, it changed statutes and its name, becoming the Municipality of Saint-Jean-de-l'Île-d'Orléans.

Demographics

Population

Language

Tourism and attractions

Like the neighbouring municipalities, Saint-Jean has a rich cultural heritage with many historic buildings. Just past the heart of the village, there is a long line of quaint houses (formerly belonging to river pilots), art galleries, and artists' studios. Of particular interest is the Mauvide-Genest Manor, a rare and exceptional example of French seigneurial past and one of the oldest remaining manor houses in Quebec. This National Historic Site was built in 1734 and restored in 1999, and is now open to the public as a historic interpretation centre.

See also
 List of municipalities in Quebec

References

External links

 Île d'Orléans - Saint-Jean-de-l'Île-d'Orléans portrait
 Mauvide-Genest Manor

Incorporated places in Capitale-Nationale
Municipalities in Quebec
L'Île-d'Orléans Regional County Municipality